The 1997 WNBA Playoffs was the postseason for the Women's National Basketball Association's 1997 season which ended with the   Houston Comets beating the New York Liberty, 1-0 (65-51). Cynthia Cooper was named the MVP of the Finals. This was the first year of WNBA playoffs.

Road to the playoffs
Eastern Conference

Western Conference

Note:Teams with an "X" clinched playoff spots.

Playoffs

Semifinals

Charlotte Sting vs. Houston Comets

New York Liberty vs. Phoenix Mercury

WNBA Championship

References

Playoffs
Women's National Basketball Association Playoffs